Justice K. S. Puttaswamy   vs Union Of India   (2017), also known as Right to Privacy verdict is a landmark decision of the Supreme Court of India, which holds that the right to privacy is protected as a fundamental right under Articles 14, 19 and 21 of the Constitution of India. 

A nine-judge bench of J.S. Khehar, J. Chelameswar, S.A. Bobde, R.K. Agrawal, R.F. Nariman, A.M. Sapre, Dr. D.Y. Chandrachud, S.K. Kaul and S.A. Nazeer unanimously held that “the right to privacy is protected as an intrinsic part of the right to life and personal liberty under Article 21 and as a part of the freedoms guaranteed by Part III of the Constitution”. It explicitly overrules previous judgements of the Supreme Court in Kharak Singh vs State of UP and M.P Sharma vs Union of India, which held that there is no fundamental right to privacy under the Indian Constitution.

This judgment clearly settled that position of law and clarified that the Right to Privacy could be infringed only when where there was a compelling state interest for doing that. This position was same as with the other fundamental rights.

Background
The new data sharing policy of WhatsApp with Facebook after Facebook acquired WhatsApp in 2014 has been challenged in the Supreme Court. The Supreme Court had to decide if the right to privacy can be enforced against private entities.

The legal challenge to the AADHAR law was being heard by a three-judge bench. The Union Government of India had taken the legal position that Right to Privacy was a common law right protected by statute. Government held that the earlier judgments of the court hadn't recognised the Right to privacy as a Fundamental Right. The three judge bench hearing the matter then referred the question of Right to Privacy to a nine-judge constitutional bench of Supreme court.

The nine judges was formed because when the case was on the list, the Supreme court Chief Justice Khehar was informed that in past there was a verdict from an eight-judge bench as well as a six-judge bench both holding the view that the right to privacy is not a fundamental right. CJI Khehar decided to constitute a nine-judges bench to rule on the question of Right to Privacy.  This nine-judge bench gave a unanimous decision on the case.

Hearing the case
The Attorney General of India K K Venugopal had opposed the elevation of privacy as a fundamental right while explaining the stand of the Union government of India, in the Supreme court. The previous Attorney General Mukul Rohatgi had opposed the right to privacy entirely, but Venugopal while opposing it had conceded in front of the court that privacy could be a "wholly qualified fundamental right"

Judgement
On 24 August 2017, the Supreme Court of India gave the Right to Privacy verdict. In the case of Justice K. S. Puttaswamy (Retd.) and Anr. vs Union Of India And Ors. The Supreme court held that the Right to Privacy is a fundamental right protected under Article 21 and Part III of the Indian Constitution. The judgement mentioned Section 377 as a "discordant note which directly bears upon the evolution of the constitutional jurisprudence on the right to privacy." In the judgement delivered by the 9-judge bench, Justice Chandrachud (who authored for Justices Khehar, Agarwal, Abdul Nazeer and himself), held that the rationale behind the Suresh Koushal (2013) Judgement is incorrect, and the judges clearly expressed their disagreement with it. Justice Kaul agreed with Justice Chandrachud's view that the right of privacy cannot be denied, even if there is a minuscule fraction of the population which is affected. He further went on to state that the majoritarian concept does not apply to Constitutional rights and the courts are often called upon to take what may be categorized as a non-majoritarian view, in the check and balance of power envisaged under the Constitution of India.

Sexual orientation is an essential attribute of privacy. Discrimination against an individual on the basis of sexual orientation is deeply offensive to the dignity and self-worth of the individual. Equality demands that the sexual orientation of each individual in society must be protected on an even platform. The right to privacy and the protection of sexual orientation lie at the core of the fundamental rights guaranteed by Articles 14, 15 and 21 of the Constitution.

...Their rights are not "so-called" but are real rights founded on sound constitutional doctrine. They inhere in the right to life. They dwell in privacy and dignity. They constitute the essence of liberty and freedom. Sexual orientation is an essential component of identity. Equal protection demands protection of the identity of every individual without discrimination.

The ADM Jabalpur case was overruled on the doctrinal grounds concerning the rights by the same verdict. At the paragraph 119 of the majority opinion the Court had ruled: 

"The judgments rendered by all the four judges constituting the majority in Additional District Magistrate, Jabalpur are seriously flawed. Life and personal liberty are inalienable to human existence. These rights are, as recognised in Kesavananda Bharati, primordial rights. They constitute rights under natural law.

The human element in the life of the individual is integrally founded on the sanctity of life. Dignity is associated with liberty and freedom. No civilised state can contemplate an encroachment upon life and personal liberty without the authority of law.

"Neither life nor liberty are bounties conferred by the State nor does the Constitution create these rights.

"The right to life has existed even before the advent of the Constitution. In recognising the right, the Constitution does not become the sole repository of the right. It would be preposterous to suggest that a democratic Constitution without a Bill of Rights would leave individuals governed by the State without either the existence of the right to live or the means of enforcement of the right. The right to life being inalienable to each individual, it existed prior to the Constitution and continued in force under Article of the Constitution.

"Justice Khanna was clearly right in holding that the recognition of the right to life and personal liberty under the Constitution does not denude the existence of that right, apart from it nor can there be a fatuous assumption that in adopting the Constitution the people of India surrendered the most precious aspect of the human persona, namely, life, liberty and freedom to the State on whose mercy these rights would depend. Such a construct is contrary to the basic foundation of the rule of law which imposes restraints upon the powers vested in the modern state when it deals with the liberties of the individual.

"The power of the Court to issue a writ of habeas corpus is a precious and undeniable feature of the rule of law."

Analysis
A nine-judge bench ruled that the Right to Privacy is a fundamental right for Indian citizens. Thus, no legislation passed by the government can  unduly violate it. Specifically, the court adopted the three-pronged test required for the encroachment of any Article 21 right – legality-i.e. through an existing law; necessity, in terms of a legitimate state objective and proportionality, that ensures a rational nexus between the object of the invasion and the means adopted to achieve that object. 

This clarification was crucial to prevent the dilution of the right in the future on the whims and fancies of the government in power. The Court adopted a liberal interpretation of the fundamental rights in order to meet the challenges posed an increasing digital age. It held that individual liberty must extend to digital spaces and individual autonomy and privacy must be protected.

This judgment clearly settled that position of law and clarified that the Right to Privacy could be infringed only when where there was a compelling state interest for doing that. This position was same as with the other fundamental rights.

This ruling by the Supreme Court paved the way for decriminalization of homosexuality in India on 6 September 2018, thus legalizing same-sex sexual intercourse between two consenting adults in private. India is the world's biggest democracy and with this ruling, it has joined United States, Canada, South Africa, the European Union, and the UK in recognizing this fundamental right.

However, as the curative petition (challenging Section 377) is currently sub-judice, the judges authored that they would leave the constitutional validity to be decided in an appropriate proceeding. Many legal experts have suggested that with this judgement, the judges have invalidated the reasoning behind the 2013 Judgement, thus laying the ground-work for Section 377 to be read down and the restoration of the 2009 Judgement of the High Court, thereby decriminalizing homosexual sex.

Successive Developments 
The judgment was interpreted as paving the way for the eventual decriminalisation of homosexuality in India in Navtej Singh Johar v. Union of India (2018) and abolishing the provisions pertaining to crime of Adultery under the Indian Legal System in the case of Joseph Shine v. Union of India (27 September 2018.)

Reception 
The Attorney General of India K K Venugopal had opposed the elevation of privacy as a fundamental right while explaining the stand of the Union government of India, in the Supreme court. Later on while delivering the speech in the farewell ceremony of CJI JS Khehar, attorney Venugopal had said, "We have now an extraordinary judgment which has upheld the right to privacy as a major fundamental right which, if we look into the newspapers or TV, has been welcomed by every single person in this country. And that, I think, is one of the greatest things that the Supreme Court of India has done."

See also 

 List of landmark court decisions in India
 Navtej Singh Johar v. Union of India (2018)
 National Legal Services Authority v. Union of India (2014)
 ADM Jabalpur v. Shivkant Shukla (1976)

References

External links
 Justice K. S. Puttaswamy (Retd.) and Anr. vs Union Of India And Ors.

LGBT rights in India
Supreme Court of India cases
2017 in India
Privacy case law
2017 in LGBT history
Indian LGBT rights case law